Hristo Markov (born 27 August 1985) is a Bulgarian footballer who played for PFC Nesebar as a midfielder.

He was raised in Lokomotiv Sofia's youth teams. So far he has played 53 games and scored 5 goals in the national championship.

In June 2007 he went on loan to PFC Vidima-Rakovski Sevlievo.

Six months later gone in Chavdar Etropole.

References

Bulgarian footballers
1985 births
Living people
First Professional Football League (Bulgaria) players
FC Lokomotiv 1929 Sofia players
PFC Vidima-Rakovski Sevlievo players
FC Chavdar Etropole players
PFC Nesebar players

Association football midfielders